Embarq Missouri, Inc. is a telephone operating company providing local telephone services in Kansas and Missouri owned by CenturyLink.

History
The company was established in 1929 as The United Telephone Company, later changing its name to United Telephone Company of Missouri upon expansion of the United Telephone System. It was owned by United Telecommunications.

United Utilities later became United Telecommunications in 1972, and acquired Sprint Long Distance from GTE in the 1980s. The company later became Sprint Corporation and United Telephone of Missouri then became Sprint Missouri, Inc., operating as part of the Sprint Local Telecommunications Division.

Sprint Corporation, in 2005, acquired Nextel and changed its name to Sprint Nextel Corporation. The company intended to spin off its wireline assets into a separate company, which in 2006 occurred as Embarq Corporation. Sprint Missouri then became Embarq Missouri, Inc.

Embarq was acquired by CenturyTel in 2009, which in 2010 changed its name to CenturyLink. This brought all the lines formerly owned by both United Telecom/Sprint and GTE within the state of Missouri under ownership of the same company, as CenturyTel had previously purchased the former GTE Midwest lines in the state from Verizon in 2002, forming CenturyTel of Missouri; however both it and Embarq Missouri remained separate operating companies within CenturyLink. Embarq Missouri at that point began carrying on business under the CenturyLink name.

Proposed sale
On August 3, 2021, Lumen announced its sale of its local telephone assets in 20 states to Apollo Global Management, including Kansas and Missouri.

References

External links
CenturyLink Missouri website (for former Embarq customers)

Telecommunications companies of the United States
Communications in Kansas
Communications in Missouri
Telecommunications companies established in 1929
Lumen Technologies
Sprint Corporation